() is a province in the North Central Coast region of Vietnam, north of the former imperial capital of .

Geography

Except for the narrow piedmont coastal plains, the terrain is dominated by hills and the Annamite Mountains.

The highlands, characterized by steep slopes, sharp crests, and narrow valleys, are covered mainly by a dense broadleaf evergreen forest. The narrow coastal plains flanking the highlands on the east have rocky headlands and consist of belts of sand dunes and, in areas where the soil is suitable, rice fields. From the crests that mark the drainage divide in the highlands, streams flow either east towards the East Sea or west into Laos or Cambodia. Those flowing eastward follow short courses through deep narrow valleys over rocky bottoms until they reach the coastal plains, where they slow down and disperse. The westward-flowing streams follow longer traces, sometimes through deep canyons which are subject to seasonal flooding. The weather features a wide range of temperatures and rainfall, with hot and dry south-west winds during the Southwest Monsoon (May to September), and much cooler wet weather during the rainy season (November to mid-March).

History
In the immediate prehistorical period, the lowlands of Quảng Trị and central Vietnam as a whole were occupied by Cham peoples (Champa), speaking a Malayo-Polynesian language, and culturally distinct from the Vietnamese to the north along the Red River. The Qin conquered parts of present-day Central Vietnam at the end of the 3rd century BCE, and administered the indigenous peoples of the area through a commandery, Rinan, for several centuries. A rebellion by the Cham in the 2nd century CE overthrew Chinese control and reestablished local government. Beginning in the 14th and 15th centuries, the Chams were defeated in the area by Vietnamese armies, and ethnic Vietnamese gradually displaced or absorbed those Chams who had not fled. Over time a distinct Vietnamese dialectical and cultural subgroup developed in the area. The region was seized by the French by 1874. In 1887 it became part of French Indochina, i.e. the Annam protectorate.

Upon the division of Vietnam in 1954 into North and South, Quảng Trị became the northernmost province of the Republic of Vietnam. The Vietnamese Demilitarized Zone lay in the province. Beginning 1964, the province gradually became a center for American bases, particularly after October 1966, when the 3rd Marine Division moved to bases just south of the demilitarized zone. In 1966, North Vietnamese forces also began occupying the northern region and pushing deeper into the province. The provincial capital, Quảng Trị City, was overrun and occupied briefly by Communist troops in April 1967, and was a principal battleground during the 1968 Tet Offensive when it was again overrun by North Vietnamese troops and held for a short period before being recaptured by South Vietnamese government and U.S. forces. The Battle of Khe Sanh (1968) was a part of the North's steady efforts to occupy the whole of the province. After Khe Sanh was evacuated in July 1968, the North Vietnamese continued their efforts to take the entire province. The most notable achievement of the North Vietnamese offensive in 1972 was capturing Quảng Trị (First Battle of Quảng Trị), although they lost much of the territory gained during the South Vietnamese counter-offensive from June through September 1972 (Second Battle of Quảng Trị).

Formerly, in 2000, Clear Path International (CPI) removed unexploded ordnance (UXO) left by the United States in Quảng Trị province, which was at the time the largest unexploded ordnance removal effort by an NGO in Vietnam's history. Since 1999, Mines Advisory Group (MAG International) has maintained operations in Quảng Trị and neighbouring Quảng Bình province, providing the only civilian staffed demining and UXO clearance operations in Vietnam. Slowly rebuilding in the areas cleared of mines is Roots of Peace working with MAG on a demine-replant model, clearing areas and working with local farmers to plant high-value crops.

Administrative divisions
Quảng Trị is subdivided into 10 district-level sub-divisions:

 8 districts:

 Cam Lộ
 Cồn Cỏ
 Đa Krông
 Gio Linh
 Hải Lăng
 Hướng Hóa
 Triệu Phong
 Vĩnh Linh

 1 district-level town:
 Quảng Trị
 1 provincial city:
 Đông Hà (capital)

They are further subdivided into 11 commune-level towns (or townlets), 117 communes, and 13 wards.

Non-governmental organizations
Currently, there are many non-governmental organizations (NGOs) working in Quảng Trị. One of the biggest problems which they are focusing on is the explosive remnants of war (ERW). Below is the list of NGOs who are very active in helping Quảng Trị province deal with this problem:
 Clear Path International (CPI)
 Mines Advisory Group (MAG)
 PeaceTrees Vietnam (PTVN)
 Project RENEW ("Restoring the Environment and Neutralizing the Effects of the War")
 Roots of Peace (RoP)

Transportation
The National Route 1 runs north–south of this province. Vietnam–Laos road also runs west–east of this province and has a junction with national road 1A. Hanoi–Saigon Railway goes through Quảng Trị. Quảng Trị Airport will be built 7 km north of Đông Hà.

Etymology
The province's name derives from Sino-Vietnamese 廣治.

See also
Bến Hải River

References

Further reading

 
 Murfin, Gary D., A. Terry Rambo, Le-Thi-Que, Why They Fled: Refugee Movement during the Spring 1975 Communist Offensive in South Vietnam Asian Survey, Vol. 16, No. 9. (Sep., 1976): 855–863
 Pearson, Lieutenant General Willard.  The War in the Northern Provinces: 1966–1968, Washington, D.C.: U.S. Government Printing Office, (1975).
 Schulzinger, Robert D. A Time for War: The United States and Vietnam, 1941–1975 (1997).

External links
 
 https://www.quangtri.gov.vn/portal/pages/http--webthunghiemqt-quangtri-gov-vn-portal-Pages-.aspx

 
Gulf of Tonkin
North Central Coast
Provinces of Vietnam